The National Monument to the Forefathers, formerly known as the Pilgrim Monument, commemorates the Mayflower Pilgrims.  Dedicated on August 1, 1889, it honors their ideals as later generally embraced by the United States. It is thought to be the world's largest solid granite monument.

Overview
Located at 72 Allerton Street in Plymouth, Massachusetts, the  monument was commissioned by the Pilgrim Society.  The original concept dates to around 1820, with actual planning beginning in 1850. The cornerstone was laid August 2, 1859 by the Grand Lodge of Masons in Massachusetts, under the direction of Grand Master John T. Heard. The monument was completed in October 1888, and was dedicated with appropriate ceremonies on August 1, 1889.

Hammatt Billings, Boston architect, illustrator and sculptor, originally conceived the monument as a  structure comparable to the Colossus of Rhodes. Shortly before his death in 1874, Billings reduced the size of the monument, which was to be made entirely of granite quarried in Hallowell, Maine.  The project was then passed to Billings' brother Joseph who, along with other sculptors including Alexander Doyle, Carl Conrads, and James Mahoney, reworked the design, although the basic components remained. The monument, which faces northeast to Plymouth Harbor (and, roughly, towards Plymouth, England), sits in the center of a circular drive, which is accessed from Allerton Street from the east.  The plan of the principal pedestal is octagonal, with four small, and four large faces; from the small faces project four buttresses. On the main pedestal stands the heroic figure of "Faith" with her right hand pointing toward heaven and her left hand clutching the Bible. Upon the four buttresses also are seated figures emblematic of the principles upon which the Pilgrims founded their Commonwealth; counter-clockwise from the east are Morality, Law, Education, and Liberty. Each was carved from a solid block of granite, posed in the sitting position upon chairs with a high relief on either side of minor characteristics.  Under "Morality" stand "Prophet" and "Evangelist"; under "Law" stand "Justice" and "Mercy"; under "Education" are "Youth" and "Wisdom"; and under "Liberty" stand "Tyranny Overthrown" and "Peace".  On the face of the buttresses, beneath these figures are high reliefs in marble, representing scenes from Pilgrim history.  Under "Morality" is "Embarcation"; under "Law" is "Treaty"; under "Education" is "Compact"; and under "Freedom" is "Landing".   Upon the four faces of the main pedestal are large panels for records. The front panel is inscribed as follows: "National Monument to the Forefathers. Erected by a grateful people in remembrance of their labors, sacrifices and sufferings for the cause of civil and religious liberty."  The right and left panels contain the names of those who came over in the Mayflower. The rear panel, which was not engraved until recently, contains a quotation from Governor William Bradford's famous history, Of Plymouth Plantation: 

The overall scheme was designed by architect Hammatt Billings. The 36-foot figure of Faith was based on a 9-foot plaster model by William Rimmer in 1875, that was enlarged and altered by Joseph Edward Billings and a sculptor named Perry (probably John D. Perry). The subsidiary statues were executed by area sculptors including Alexander Doyle, Carl Conrads, and James H. Mahoney.

National Register
The monument was listed on the National Register of Historic Places on August 30, 1974.  Originally under the care of the Pilgrim Society, it was given to  the Massachusetts government in 2001.  It and Plymouth Rock constitute the Pilgrim Memorial State Park.  Although intended as national in scope, the Forefathers Monument is not a federal "National Monument" as understood today from the Antiquities Act of 1906.

Film
Monumental: In Search of America's National Treasure, a 2012 documentary hosted by Kirk Cameron, features the history of the monument and the values of those it commemorates.

Images

Seated Figures

Panels on Monument

See also
Pilgrim Monument
National Register of Historic Places listings in Plymouth County, Massachusetts

References

Further reading

External links

National Monument to the Forefathers from SIRIS.

1889 establishments in Massachusetts
History of the Thirteen Colonies
Monuments and memorials in Massachusetts
Buildings and structures in Plymouth, Massachusetts
Monuments and memorials on the National Register of Historic Places in Massachusetts
Tourist attractions in Plymouth County, Massachusetts
1888 sculptures
Marble sculptures in Massachusetts
National Register of Historic Places in Plymouth County, Massachusetts
Granite sculptures in Massachusetts
Books in art
Monuments and memorials to the Pilgrims